The Women's Yngling was a sailing event on the Sailing at the 2008 Summer Olympics program in Qingdao International Sailing Centre. Eleven races (last one a medal race) were scheduled. Only nine races were completed including the medal race due to lack of wind. 45 sailors, on 15 boats, from 15 nations competed. Ten boats qualified for the medal race.

Race schedule

Course areas and course configurations 
For the Yngling course areas A  (Yellow) and E  (Pink) were used. The location (36°1'26"’N, 120°26'52"E) points to the center of the 0.6nm radius Yellow course area and the location (36°2'44"N, 120°28'9"E) points to the center of the 0.75nm radius Pink course area. The target time for the course was about 60 minutes for the races and 30 minutes for the medal race. The race management could choose from several course configurations.

Outer courses 
 O1: Start – 1 – 2 – 3s/3p – 2 – 3p – Finish
 O2: Start – 1 – 2 – 3s/3p – 2 – 3s/3p – 2 – 3p – Finish
 O3: Start – 1 – 2 – 3s/3p – 2 – 3s/3p – 2 – 3s/3p – 2 – 3p – Finish

Inner courses 
 I1: Start – 1 – 4s/4p – 1 – 2 – 3p – Finish
 I2: Start – 1 – 4s/4p – 1 – 4s/4p – 1 – 2 – 3p – Finish
 I3: Start – 1 – 4s/4p – 1 – 4s/4p – 1 – 4s/4p – 1 – 2 – 3p – Finish

Windward-leeward courses 
 W2: Start – 1 – 4s/4p – 1 – Finish
 W3: Start – 1 – 4s/4p – 1 – 4s/4p – 1 – Finish
 W4: Start – 1 – 4s/4p – 1 – 4s/4p – 1 – 4s/4p – 1 – Finish

Weather conditions 
In the lead up to the Olympics many questioned the choice of Qingdao as a venue with very little predicted wind. During the races the wind was pretty light and quite unpredictable. Due to lack of wind (< 1.6 knots) one racing day was cancelled and the medal race was postponed to the next day.

Final results

Daily standings

Further reading

References 

Women's Yngling
Yngling (keelboat)
Women's events at the 2008 Summer Olympics
Olym